Brian Timothy Fitzpatrick (born May 9, 1975) is an American academic and lawyer. Fitzpatrick is known for his unorthodox advocacy of class action lawsuits from a conservative point of view, and is the author of a book on the subject, The Conservative Case for Class Actions (University of Chicago Press, 2019).

Education
Fitzpatrick received a Bachelor of Science in 1997 from the University of Notre Dame where he was the first runner up to Valedictorian. He received the Fay Diploma for the highest combined average for three years in his class at Harvard Law School in 2000.

Career
Fitzpatrick joined Vanderbilt University Law School in 2007 after spending time as a John M. Olin Fellow at the New York University School of Law. He has clerked for Judge Diarmuid O'Scannlain of the United States Court of Appeals for the Ninth Circuit and Associate Justice Antonin Scalia of the Supreme Court of the United States. Between his time as a clerk and professor, Fitzpatrick worked as an associate in Sidley Austin's Washington, D.C. office and as Special Counsel for Supreme Court Nominations to Senator John Cornyn. He teaches several courses at Vanderbilt, including Federal Courts and a seminar on the relationship between judges and politics.

See also 
 List of law clerks of the Supreme Court of the United States (Seat 9)

References

External links 
 Vanderbilt Law School faculty profile
 

1975 births
Living people
21st-century American lawyers
American legal scholars
Federalist Society members
Harvard Law School alumni
Law clerks of the Supreme Court of the United States
Tennessee lawyers
University of Notre Dame alumni
Vanderbilt University Law School faculty